Caroline Abbey Crenshaw is an American attorney serving as a commissioner of the U.S. Securities and Exchange Commission.

Education 

Crenshaw received her Bachelor of Arts, cum laude from Harvard College and her Juris Doctor, magna cum laude, from the University of Minnesota Law School.

Career 

Crenshaw practiced law in the Washington, D.C. office of Sutherland Asbill & Brennan LLP. At Sutherland, she represented public companies, broker-dealers, and investment advisers on complex securities law investigations and enforcement matters. She attended The JAG School at the University of Virginia and entered U.S. Army JAG Corps. She currently serves as a Captain in the U.S. Army Judge Advocate General's Corps.

U.S. Securities and Exchange Commission 

Crenshaw joined the SEC in 2013 and has served in the Office of Compliance Inspections and Examinations, the Division of Investment Management, and as Counsel to Commissioners Kara Stein and Robert J. Jackson Jr. Her work has focused on legal and policy analysis related to corporate governance, investment management, enforcement, international regulation, and the oversight of self-regulatory organizations.

On June 18, 2020, President Trump announced his intent to nominate Crenshaw to serve as a Commissioner on the U.S. Securities and Exchange Commission. Her nomination was sent to the Senate later that day; President Trump nominated Crenshaw to the Democratic seat vacated by Robert J. Jackson Jr, whose term expired.
She was confirmed by the Senate on August 6, 2020, by voice vote. Crenshaw was sworn in on August 17, 2020.

Personal life 

She married Alexander Wysham Cole on February 17, 2018, at St. Mark's Episcopal Church in Washington, D.C.

References

External links 
SEC biography

Living people
Year of birth missing (living people)
21st-century American lawyers
21st-century American Episcopalians
Harvard College alumni
United States Army Judge Advocate General's Corps
Lawyers from Washington, D.C.
U.S. Securities and Exchange Commission personnel
Members of the U.S. Securities and Exchange Commission
Trump administration personnel
University of Minnesota Law School alumni
Washington, D.C., Democrats
21st-century American women lawyers